Mo Lua, Irish ecclesiastic, fl. c. 600.

Mo Lua is given in the genealogies as Mo Lua of Cluain Fada (Cloonfad) or Cluain Fearta (Clonfert) mac Carrthach mac Daighre, or Mo-Lua mac Carthach mac Fualascach mac Colmán mac Éanda. His association with either foundation is unclear, but is of early date.

References

 The Great Book of Irish Genealogies, 731.3, 731.5, pp. 718-19, volume two, Dubhaltach MacFhirbhisigh; edited, with translation and indices by Nollaig Ó Muraíle, 2003-2004. .
 The Parish of Clontuskert - Glimpses into its Past, 2009.

Christian clergy from County Galway
People from County Roscommon
6th-century Irish priests